Onamungundo is a settlement in the Ondonga area of Oshikoto Region in Namibia. The village was the seat of the Ondonga royal house during the reign of the late King Immanuel Kauluma Elifas.

References

Populated places in the Oshikoto Region